Peggy Clarke or Peggy Clark may refer to:
Peggy Clark (1915–1996), American lighting designer, costume designer, and set designer
Peggy Clarke (chess player) (1926–2018), joint British ladies' chess champion
Peggy Clarke, an actress in No Way Back
Peggy Clark, a fictional character in 3-D Man stories in Marvel Comics

See also
Margaret Clark (disambiguation)
Margaret Clarke (disambiguation)